Karl Hudspith (born 31 March 1988 in Hammersmith, London), is a British rower and scientist. Hudspith competed in four Boat Races from 2011 to 2014 for Oxford, and was a member of the winners' team on three occasions. Hudspith competed for Great Britain in rowing at Junior, Under-23, Student, and Senior levels and is a two time World University Rowing Champion. He completed his PhD at the University of Oxford where he developed a next-generation sequencing based diagnostic test for inherited retinal degeneration before beginning a legal career in American intellectual property law in Washington DC.

Rowing career
Hudspith learned to row at Hampton School Boat Club, where he represented Great Britain in his final year at the 2006 Junior World Championships. Hudspith would go on to represent Great Britain at the 2008, 2009, and 2010 World Rowing U23 Championships, the 2013 World Rowing Cup, and the 2010 and 2014 FISU World University Rowing Championships.

Hudspith was in the five seat of the winning Oxford Blue boat at the 2011 Oxford-Cambridge Boat Race. For the 2012 season Hudspith was elected president of the Oxford University Boat Club, and rowed in the five seat during the controversial 2012 Boat race which was disrupted by a protester. Hudspith rowed in the six seat for the 2013 boat race, which Oxford won by a length and a half. Hudspith competed in his fourth boat race in 2014 in the three seat, winning by eleven lengths, the largest winning margin in 41 years.

Science career

Hudspith obtained his bachelor's degree in Biology at Oxford Brookes University, before completing a PhD in Clinical Neurosciences at the University of Oxford. During Hudspith's Doctoral work he helped develop a next-generation sequencing based DNA diagnostic test for patients with inherited retinal degenerations which was introduced into the NHS in Oxfordshire. Hudspith was part of the team that discovered that mutations in the PIGQ and CBL genes are a cause of Ohtahara syndrome, a rare and fatal form of early-onset epilepsy.

Hudspith completed his post-doctoral fellowship at the Wilmer Eye Institute at Johns Hopkins University. Hudspith worked in the lab of Dr Mandeep Singh with the aim of developing a stem-cell based regenerative medicine treatment for inherited retinal degenerations. He was the 2015 and 2018 recipient of the Juliette RP Vision Foundation Young Scientist Award.

Legal career

Hudspith joined the law firm of Wilson Sonsini Goodrich & Rosati as a scientific adviser in January 2019. Hudspith is part of the firm's patents and innovation practice in the life sciences

Personal life

Hudspith grew up in Twickenham, England, and attended Hampton School. He currently lives in Baltimore, Maryland and is married to Lauren Hudspith.

References

Living people
1988 births
Alumni of St Peter's College, Oxford
British people of Serbian descent
British male rowers
Rowers from Greater London
English male rowers
Oxford University Boat Club rowers